3D Movie  may refer to:

A 3-D film, a type of film projected to create the illusion of depth
3D Movie (software), computer file for a software product by Microsoft